Wingspread, also known as the Herbert F. Johnson House, is a historic house in Wind Point, Wisconsin.  It was built in 1938–39 to a design by Frank Lloyd Wright for Herbert Fisk Johnson Jr., then the president of S.C. Johnson, and was considered by Wright to be one of his most elaborate and expensive house designs to date.  The property is now a conference center operated by The Johnson Foundation.  It was designated a National Historic Landmark in 1989.

Description and history
Wingspread stands near the center of the Wind Point peninsula, a triangular protrusion into Lake Michigan north of the city of Racine. The house is approached from the north by a long winding drive. It consists of a central hub, from which four long arms radiate. Each of the wings originally housed a different function: parents' wing, children's wing, service wing, and guest wing, with the public spaces in the center. The hub appears as a domed structure, with clerestory windows on the sides, and a viewing platform at the top.

The house was built in 1938–39. Its construction was overseen by a young John Lautner.  Wright's client, Herbert Fisk Johnson Jr. was also a corporate client, for whom Wright designed the Johnson Wax Headquarters Building in Racine, which was built at about the same time.  The house, at 14,000 sq feet, is one of the largest of Wright-designed homes.  It is also considered to be the last of Wright's Prairie School inspired designs, and was one of his most expensive residential designs.

The Johnson family donated the property to The Johnson Foundation in 1959 as an international educational conference facility. It is also open to the public for tours.

The property was listed on the National Register of Historic Places in 1975, and was designated a National Historic Landmark in 1989.

Gallery

See also
List of National Historic Landmarks in Wisconsin
National Register of Historic Places listings in Racine County, Wisconsin

References

Storrer, William Allin. The Frank Lloyd Wright Companion. University Of Chicago Press, 2006,  (S.239)

External links
Wingspread web site
Photos on Arcaid

Frank Lloyd Wright buildings
Houses on the National Register of Historic Places in Wisconsin
Houses in Racine County, Wisconsin
National Historic Landmarks in Wisconsin
Houses completed in 1939
Historic house museums in Wisconsin
Museums in Racine County, Wisconsin
National Register of Historic Places in Racine County, Wisconsin
1939 establishments in Wisconsin